Thomas's pine vole (Microtus thomasi) is a species of rodent in the family Cricetidae.
It is found in Bosnia and Herzegovina, Greece, Montenegro, North Macedonia, Serbia, and possibly Albania.

References

Musser, G. G. and M. D. Carleton. 2005. Superfamily Muroidea. pp. 894–1531 in Mammal Species of the World a Taxonomic and Geographic Reference. D. E. Wilson and D. M. Reeder eds. Johns Hopkins University Press, Baltimore.

Microtus
Mammals described in 1903
Taxa named by Gerald Edwin Hamilton Barrett-Hamilton
Taxonomy articles created by Polbot